is a Japanese manga series written by Tsuina Miura and illustrated by Takahiro Oba. The series was serialized online in DeNA's Manga Box app from December 2013 to April 2019, with Kodansha compiling it into twenty-one tankōbon volumes. The manga is licensed in North America by Seven Seas Entertainment. A sequel manga titled  was serialized in Kodansha's Magazine Pocket website and app from July 2019 to April 2021, with seven tankōbon volumes released. An original net animation (ONA) anime series adaptation by Zero-G streamed worldwide on Netflix in February 2021.

Premise 
High school girl Yuri Honjō is transported to a world full of skyscrapers and suspension bridges connecting them. She then finds herself being hunted by mysterious figures wearing masks. She later discovers that her brother, Rika, is also trapped in this world. She thereupon encounters other teenagers in the same situation, but it is not clear if they will be friends or foes.

Characters

Yuri is a schoolgirl who was suddenly transported into a strange world filled with high-rise buildings where she and others like her are chased by killers donning mysterious white masks. Upon realizing that her older brother Rika has also been transported to this bizarre world, the two siblings decide to find each other and look for a way to escape. She has a brother complex.

Mayuko is one of the people transported to the mysterious skyscraper world. Bullied and neglected by everyone, including her parents, Mayuko became a merciless killer in this new world, unwilling to trust anyone. However, after being saved by Yuri, Mayuko devotes herself to helping Yuri. After they becoming a friends, Mayuko develops feelings for Yuri.

Kuon is a God Candidate. She is sometimes referred to as the Railgun User. Kuon is delicate and innocent in all matters. Having adapted to a high social etiquette, she did not have the capability to understand the dangerous world at first sight. Throughout the travels with her companion, Sniper Mask, she is able to show her abilities, yet she remains naive and humble nonetheless. She finds Sniper Mask intriguing and mysterious, which leads her to develop feelings for him due to his care for her.

Rika is the older brother of Yuri and one of the people transported to the mysterious skyscraper world. His dependable character leads him to quickly become the leader of a small human group working hard to find a way out of this world while keeping contact with his sister through his phone to give her advice and exchange information.

Also known as "Mr. Sniper", Sniper Mask is an Angel who wields a sniper rifle. He has an unknown connection to Rika.

Aikawa is a God Candidate who controls thirty Angels.

Kusakabe is an Angel who serves Aikawa.

Aohara is a God Candidate who controls the Angels Ein and Zwei. He is initially obsessed with becoming a Perfect God, but after being defeated by Yuri, he becomes her ally.

Media

Manga

The manga was serialized online in DeNA's Manga Box app from December 5, 2013 to April 4, 2019. Kodansha held the license to publish the series and compiled it into twenty-one tankōbon volumes, while Seven Seas Entertainment published it in two-in-one omnibus volumes in North America from June 2018 to October 2021. A sequel manga, titled High-Rise Invasion Arrive, was serialized in Kodansha's Magazine Pocket website and app from July 28, 2019 to April 24, 2021 and was compiled into seven volumes.

Anime
At the Netflix Anime Festival on October 26, 2020, an original net animation (ONA) anime series adaptation was announced with a February 2021 release window. In mid-January 2021, Netflix revealed that the series was scheduled for a February 25 release on the streaming service. The series was animated by Zero-G and directed by Masahiro Takata, with Touko Machida handling series' composition, Yōichi Ueda designing the characters, and tatsuo and Youichi Sakai composing the series' music. EMPiRE performed the opening theme "HON-NO," while Have a Nice Day! performed the ending theme .

Reception
Jean-Karlo Lemus and Steve Jones reviewed the series in their "This Week in Anime" segment for Anime News Network. Lemus said that the series does not give the "best first impression," and while he hated it when he first started watching, he became "indifferent," comparing it to Gantz, adding that the series "preoccupied itself with panty shots and various states of undress." Jones, however, praised the portrayal of the villains and hoped that a second season of the series would be produced, while acknowledging it is "not for everyone."

Notes

References

External links
 
 
 

2021 anime ONAs
Action anime and manga
Anime series based on manga
Fiction about death games
Girls with guns anime and manga
Horror anime and manga
Isekai anime and manga
Japanese-language Netflix original programming
Japanese webcomics
Kodansha manga
Netflix original anime
Seven Seas Entertainment titles
Shōnen manga
Survival anime and manga
Webcomics in print
Zero-G (studio)